Émile Carrara (11 January 1925 – 28 April 1992) was a French professional road and track cyclist. On the track, he notably won a total of nine six-day races as well as the national pursuit championships in 1947. On the road, his biggest victory was the 1944 Grand Prix des Nations.

Major results

Road
1944
 1st Grand Prix des Nations
1945
 1st 
 1st Paris–Mantes
 2nd Grand Prix des Nations
1946
 5th Liège–Bastogne–Liège
1947
 1st Critérium des As
 2nd Critérium National de la Route

Track

1947
 1st  Individual pursuit, National Track Championships
1949
 1st Six Days of Saint-Étienne (with Raymond Goussot)
 1st  (with Raymond Goussot)
1951
 1st Six Days of Berlin 1 (with Guy Lapébie)
 1st Six Days of Berlin 2 (with Heinz Zoll)
 1st Six Days of Hanover (with Guy Lapébie)
 1st Six Days of Munich (with Guy Lapébie)
1952
 1st Six Days of Hanover (with Georges Senfftleben)
 1st Six Days of Dortmund (with Guy Lapébie)
 1st Six Days of Saint-Étienne (with Georges Senfftleben)
 1st Six Days of Berlin (with Guy Lapébie)
 1st  (with Georges Senfftleben)
1953
 2nd  Madison, European Track Championships
1954
 1st Six Days of Berlin (with Dominique Forlini)

References

External links

1925 births
1992 deaths
French male cyclists
French track cyclists
Sportspeople from Argenteuil
Cyclists from Île-de-France